HMCS Arleux was one of twelve  naval trawlers used by the Royal Canadian Navy (RCN). Entering service in 1918 near the end of the First World War, the vessel had a short career with the RCN, being transferred to the Department of Marine and Fisheries in 1922. Arleux was used for fisheries patrol off the east coast of Canada until 1939, when the ship was reacquired by the RCN at the onset of the Second World War. Used as a gate vessel during the war and designated Gate Vessel 16, the ship was sold for mercantile purposes following the war. The ship foundered in 1948 off the coast of Nova Scotia.

Design and description

The RCN's Battle-class trawlers formed part of the Canadian naval response to Admiralty warnings to Canada about the growing German U-boat threat to merchant shipping in the western Atlantic. Intended to augment anti-submarine patrols off Canada's east coast, these ships were modelled on contemporary British North Sea trawlers, since the standard types of Canadian fishing vessels were considered unsuitable for patrol work.

Twelve vessels were ordered on 2 February 1917 from two shipyards, Polson Iron Works of Toronto and Canadian Vickers of Montreal.

All twelve trawlers were equipped with a QF 12-pounder 12 cwt naval gun mounted forward. This was considered to be the smallest gun that stood a chance of putting a surfaced U-boat out of action, and they also carried a small number of depth charges. The trawlers were named after battles of the Western Front during the First World War that Canadians had been involved in. They cost between $155,000 and $160,000 per vessel.

Construction and service history

Named after the April 1917 Battle of Arleux, the ship was built by Canadian Vickers at Montreal and launched on 9 August 1917. Intended for use during the 1917 shipping season, the construction of the vessels was delayed by the entry of the United States into the war. With higher wages found south of the border, a shortage of skilled labour developed in the shipyards, coupled with a shortage of construction material. The six vessels ordered from Canadian Vickers were delayed further by difficulty in providing engines for the trawlers. The hulls had been finished during Summer 1917. However, the engines did not arrive until the fall. The trawler was commissioned on 5 June 1918 with sister ship .

Arleux sailed to the east coast where for the 1918 shipping season, all the Battle-class trawlers were assigned to patrol and escort duties based out of Sydney, Nova Scotia. Following the end of the war, Arleux was used operationally by the Department of Marine and Fisheries, but remained a commissioned RCN vessel until 30 June 1922. Arleux was used a fisheries patrol vessel on the east coast and often served as a mother ship to the winter haddock fishing fleet. Reacquired by the RCN and re-commissioned on 13 September 1939, Arleux was designated Gate Vessel 16 at Halifax, Nova Scotia in 1940, remaining in this role for the rest of the war. Arleux was sold for mercantile use on 15 February 1946 to Atlantic Trawlers Ltd. The ship foundered on 19 August 1948 off White Head Bay, Nova Scotia.

References

Notes

Citations

Sources

External links
 Battle-class trawlers

 

Battle-class trawlers
World War I naval ships of Canada
1917 ships
Auxiliary ships of the Royal Canadian Navy